Kieron Williamson (born 4 August 2002) is a watercolour, oil and pastel artist from Holt, Norfolk in England. His paintings and ability by the age of six have caused considerable interest in the UK media and are notable for his advanced use of perspective and shading.

Biography
He has been described as a prodigy, and at his second exhibition in 2009, his paintings sold out in 14 minutes, raising a total of £18,200 for 16 paintings. A subsequent exhibition in Holt in July 2010 saw his paintings all sold within 30 minutes, at a total value of £150,000.

The following week, on Friday, 6 August 2010, Williamson revealed on the BBC Norfolk website some of his latest paintings that would be exhibited in 2011.

At the beginning of November 2010 the family revealed to the Eastern Daily Press that they might re-locate to Cornwall to further Kieron's painting, but in the event the family bought a new home at Ludham, east of Norwich, in Kieron's name, with the proceeds of his art sales. In November 2011, a further 33 paintings were sold in 10 minutes for £100,000, including an impression of Istanbul's Süleymaniye Mosque for £15,595. In July 2013 earnings from sales amounted to almost £2 million, when sales in successive weeks raised £242,000 for 23 paintings, and £210,000 for 12 paintings.

In 2013 as Kieron Williamson, aged 10, had made an estimated £1,500,000 from his paintings, the BBC featured a story called "Art prodigy poses 'ethical nightmare' for parents".

References

Further reading

External links
 Kieron Williamson Official Site

2002 births
Living people
21st-century English male artists
21st-century English painters
Child artists
English watercolourists
English landscape painters
People from Ludham
People from Holt, Norfolk
Pastel artists